The Kushan Empire (Brahmi:   , ;; ,) was a syncretic empire, formed by the Yuezhi, in the Bactrian territories in the early 1st century. It spread to encompass much of modern-day territory of Uzbekistan, Afghanistan, Pakistan and Northern India, at least as far as Saketa and Sarnath near Varanasi (Benares), where inscriptions have been found dating to the era of the Kushan Emperor Kanishka the Great.

The Kushans were most probably one of five branches of the Yuezhi confederation, an Indo-European nomadic people of possible Tocharian origin, who migrated from northwestern China (Xinjiang and Gansu) and settled in ancient Bactria. The founder of the dynasty, Kujula Kadphises, followed Greek religious ideas and iconography after the Greco-Bactrian tradition, and was also a follower of the Shaivite sect of Hinduism. The Kushans in general were also great patrons of Buddhism, and, starting with Emperor Kanishka, they also employed elements of Zoroastrianism in their pantheon. They played an important role in the spread of Buddhism to Central Asia and China.

The Kushans possibly used the Greek language initially for administrative purposes, but soon began to use the Bactrian language. Kanishka sent his armies north of the Karakoram mountains. A direct road from Gandhara to China remained under Kushan control for more than a century, encouraging travel across the Karakoram and facilitating the spread of Mahayana Buddhism to China. The Kushan dynasty had diplomatic contacts with the Roman Empire, Sasanian Persia, the Aksumite Empire and the Han dynasty of China. The Kushan Empire was at the center of trade relations between the Roman Empire and China: according to Alain Daniélou, "for a time, the Kushana Empire was the centerpoint of the major civilizations". While much philosophy, art, and science was created within its borders, the only textual record of the empire's history today comes from inscriptions and accounts in other languages, particularly Chinese.

The Kushan Empire fragmented into semi-independent kingdoms in the 3rd century AD, which fell to the Sasanians invading from the west, establishing the Kushano-Sasanian Kingdom in the areas of Sogdiana, Bactria and Gandhara. In the 4th century, the Guptas, an Indian dynasty also pressed from the east. The last of the Kushan and Kushano-Sasanian kingdoms were eventually overwhelmed by invaders from the north, known as the Kidarites, and then the Hephthalites.

Origins

Chinese sources describe the Guìshuāng (貴霜, Old Chinese: *kuj-s  [s]raŋ), i.e. the Kushans, as one of the five aristocratic tribes of the Yuezhi. Many scholars believe that the Yuezhi were a people of Indo-European origin. A specifically Tocharian origin of the Yuezhi is often suggested. An Iranian, specifically Saka, origin, also has some support among scholars. Others suggest that the Yuezhi might have originally been a nomadic Iranian people, who were then partially assimilated by settled Tocharians, thus containing both Iranian and Tocharian elements.

The Yuezhi were described in the Records of the Great Historian and the Book of Han as living in the grasslands of eastern Xinjiang and northwestern part of Gansu, in the northwest of modern-day China, until their King was beheaded by the Xiongnu (匈奴) who were also at war with China, which eventually forced them to migrate west in 176–160 BC. The five tribes constituting the Yuezhi are known in Chinese history as Xiūmì (休密), Guìshuāng (貴霜), Shuāngmǐ (雙靡), Xìdùn (肸頓), and Dūmì (都密).

The Yuezhi reached the Hellenic kingdom of Greco-Bactria (in northern Afghanistan and Uzbekistan) around 135 BC. The displaced Greek dynasties resettled to the southeast in areas of the Hindu Kush (in present-day Afghanistan and Pakistan) and the Indus basin (in present-day Pakistan and India), occupying the western part of the Indo-Greek Kingdom.

In South Asia , Kushan emperors regularly used the dynastic name ΚΟϷΑΝΟ ("Koshano") on their coinage. Some later Indian literary sources referred to the Kushans as Turushka, a name which in later Sanskrit sources was confused with Turk, "probably due to the fact that Tukharistan passed into the hands of the western Turks in the seventh century". According to John M. Rosenfield, Turushka, Tukhāra or Tukhāra are variations of the word Tokhari in Indian writings. Yet, according to Wink, "nowadays no historian considers them to be Turkish-Mongoloid or "Hun", although there is no doubt about their Central-Asian origin."

Early Kushans

Some traces remain of the presence of the Kushans in the area of Bactria and Sogdiana in the 2nd-1st century BC, where they had displaced the Sakas, who moved further south. Archaeological structures are known in Takht-i Sangin, Surkh Kotal (a monumental temple), and in the palace of Khalchayan. On the ruins of ancient Hellenistic cities such as Ai-Khanoum, the Kushans are known to have built fortresses. Various sculptures and friezes from this period are known, representing horse-riding archers, and, significantly, men such as the Kushan prince of Khalchayan with artificially deformed skulls, a practice well attested in nomadic Central Asia. Some of the Khalchayan sculptural scenes are also thought to depict the Kushans fighting against the Sakas. In these portrayals, the Yuezhis are shown with a majestic demeanour, whereas the Sakas are typically represented with side-whiskers, and more or less grotesque facial expressions.

The Chinese first referred to these people as the Yuezhi and said they established the Kushan Empire, although the relationship between the Yuezhi and the Kushans is still unclear. Ban Gu's Book of Han tells us the Kushans (Kuei-shuang) divided up Bactria in 128 BC. Fan Ye's Book of Later Han "relates how the chief of the Kushans, Ch'iu-shiu-ch'ueh (the Kujula Kadphises of coins), founded by means of the submission of the other Yueh-chih clans the Kushan Empire."

The earliest documented ruler, and the first one to proclaim himself as a Kushan ruler, was Heraios. He calls himself a "tyrant" in Greek on his coins, and also exhibits skull deformation. He may have been an ally of the Greeks, and he shared the same style of coinage. Heraios may have been the father of the first Kushan emperor Kujula Kadphises.

The Chinese Book of Later Han chronicles then gives an account of the formation of the Kushan empire based on a report made by the Chinese general Ban Yong to the Chinese Emperor c. AD 125:

Diverse cultural influences
In the 1st century BC, the Guishuang (Ch: 貴霜) gained prominence over the other Yuezhi tribes, and welded them into a tight confederation under commander Kujula Kadphises. The name Guishuang was adopted in the West and modified into Kushan to designate the confederation, although the Chinese continued to call them Yuezhi.

Gradually wresting control of the area from the Scythian tribes, the Kushans expanded south into the region traditionally known as Gandhara (an area primarily in Pakistan's Pothowar and Khyber Pakhtunkhwa region) and established twin capitals in Begram. and Charsadda, then known as Kapisa and Pushklavati respectively.

The Kushans adopted elements of the Hellenistic culture of Bactria. They adopted the Greek alphabet to suit their own language (with the additional development of the letter Þ "sh", as in "Kushan") and soon began minting coinage on the Greek model. On their coins they used Greek language legends combined with Pali legends (in the Kharoshthi script), until the first few years of the reign of Kanishka. After the middle of Kanishka's reign, they used Kushan language legends (in an adapted Greek script), combined with legends in Greek (Greek script) and legends in Prakrit (Kharoshthi script).

The Kushans "adopted many local beliefs and customs, including Zoroastrianism and the two rising religions in the region, the Greek cults and Buddhism". From the time of Vima Takto, many Kushans started adopting aspects of Buddhist culture, and like the Egyptians, they absorbed the strong remnants of the Greek culture of the Hellenistic Kingdoms, becoming at least partly Hellenised. The great Kushan emperor Vima Kadphises may have embraced Shaivism (a sect of Hinduism), as surmised by coins minted during the period. The following Kushan emperors represented a wide variety of faiths including Buddhism, Zoroastrianism and Shaivism.

The rule of the Kushans linked the seagoing trade of the Indian Ocean with the commerce of the Silk Road through the long-civilized Indus Valley. At the height of the dynasty, the Kushans loosely ruled a territory that extended to the Aral Sea through present-day Uzbekistan, Afghanistan, and Pakistan into northern India.

The loose unity and comparative peace of such a vast expanse encouraged long-distance trade, brought Chinese silks to Rome, and created strings of flourishing urban centers.

Territorial expansion

Rosenfield notes that archaeological evidence of a Kushan rule of long duration is present in an area stretching from Surkh Kotal, Begram, the summer capital of the Kushans, Peshawar, the capital under Kanishka I, Taxila, and Mathura, the winter capital of the Kushans. The Kushans introduced for the first time a form of governance which consisted of Kshatrapas (Brahmi:, Kṣatrapa, "Satraps") and Mahakshatrapa (Brahmi:, Mahakṣatrapa, "Great Satraps").

Other areas of probable rule include Khwarezm and its capital city of Toprak-Kala, Kausambi (excavations of Allahabad University), Sanchi and Sarnath (inscriptions with names and dates of Kushan kings), Malwa and Maharashtra, and Odisha (imitation of Kushan coins, and large Kushan hoards).

Kushan invasions in the 1st century AD had been given as an explanation for the migration of Indians from the Indian Subcontinent toward Southeast Asia according to proponents of a Greater India theory by 20th-century Indian nationalists. However, there is no evidence to support this hypothesis.

 Lines 4 to 7 of the inscription describe the cities which were under the rule of Kanishka, among which six names are identifiable: Ujjain, Kundina, Saketa, Kausambi, Pataliputra, and Champa (although the text is not clear whether Champa was a possession of Kanishka or just beyond it). The Buddhist text Śrīdharmapiṭakanidānasūtra—known via a Chinese translation made in AD 472—refers to the conquest of Pataliputra by Kanishka. A 2nd century stone inscription by a Great Satrap named Rupiamma was discovered in Pauni, south of the Narmada river, suggesting that Kushan control extended this far south, although this could alternatively have been controlled by the Western Satraps.

In the East, as late as the 3rd century AD, decorated coins of Huvishka were dedicated at Bodh Gaya together with other gold offerings under the "Enlightenment Throne" of the Buddha, suggesting direct Kushan influence in the area during that period. Coins of the Kushans are found in abundance as far as Bengal, and the ancient Bengali state of Samatata issued coins copied from the coinage of Kanishka I, although probably only as a result of commercial influence. Coins in imitation of Kushan coinage have also been found abundantly in the eastern state of Orissa.

In the West, the Kushan state covered the Pārata state of Balochistan, western Pakistan, Afghanistan, Kyrgyzstan, Tajikistan, Uzbekistan, and Turkmenistan. Turkmenistan was known for the Kushan Buddhist city of Merv.

Northward, in the 1st century AD, the Kujula Kadphises sent an army to the Tarim Basin to support the city-state of Kucha, which had been resisting the Chinese invasion of the region, but they retreated after minor encounters. In the 2nd century AD, the Kushans under Kanishka made various forays into the Tarim Basin, where they had various contacts with the Chinese. Kanishka held areas of the Tarim Basin apparently corresponding to the ancient regions held by the Yüeh-zhi, the possible ancestors of the Kushan. There was Kushan influence on coinage in Kashgar, Yarkand, and Khotan. According to Chinese chronicles, the Kushans (referred to as Da Yuezhi in Chinese sources) requested, but were denied, a Han princess, even though they had sent presents to the Chinese court. In retaliation, they marched on Ban Chao in AD 90 with a force of 70,000 but were defeated by the smaller Chinese force. Chinese chronicles relate battles between the Kushans and the Chinese general Ban Chao. The Yuezhi retreated and paid tribute to the Chinese Empire. The regions of the Tarim Basin were all ultimately conquered by Ban Chao. Later, during the Yuánchū period (AD 114–120), the Kushans sent a military force to install Chenpan, who had been a hostage among them, as king of Kashgar.

Kushan fortresses
Several Kushan fortresses are known, particularly in Bactria, which were often rebuilt on top of Hellenistic fortifications, as in Kampir Tepe. They are often characterized by arrow-shaped loopholes for archers.

Main Kushan rulers
Kushan rulers are recorded for a period of about three centuries, from circa AD 30 to circa 375, until the invasions of the Kidarites. They ruled around the same time as the Western Satraps, the Satavahanas, and the first Gupta Empire rulers.

Kujula Kadphises (c. 30 – c. 80) 

These conquests by Kujula Kadphises probably took place sometime between AD 45 and 60 and laid the basis for the Kushan Empire which was rapidly expanded by his descendants.

Kujula issued an extensive series of coins and fathered at least two sons, Sadaṣkaṇa (who is known from only two inscriptions, especially the Rabatak inscription, and apparently never ruled), and seemingly Vima Takto.

Kujula Kadphises was the great-grandfather of Kanishka.

Vima Taktu or Sadashkana (c. 80 – c. 95)

Vima Takto (Ancient Chinese: 閻膏珍 Yangaozhen) is mentioned in the Rabatak inscription (another son, Sadashkana, is mentioned in an inscription of Senavarman, the King of Odi). He was the predecessor of Vima Kadphises, and Kanishka I. He expanded the Kushan Empire into the northwest of South Asia. The Hou Hanshu says:

Vima Kadphises (c. 95 – c. 127)

Vima Kadphises (Kushan language: Οοημο Καδφισης) was a Kushan emperor from around AD 95–127, the son of Sadashkana and the grandson of Kujula Kadphises, and the father of Kanishka I, as detailed by the Rabatak inscription.

Vima Kadphises added to the Kushan territory by his conquests in Bactria. He issued an extensive series of coins and inscriptions. He issued gold coins in addition to the existing copper and silver coinage.

Kanishka I (c. 127 – c. 150)

The rule of Kanishka the Great, fourth Kushan king, lasted for about 23 years from c. AD 127. Upon his accession, Kanishka ruled a huge territory (virtually all of northern India), south to Ujjain and Kundina and east beyond Pataliputra, according to the Rabatak inscription:

His territory was administered from two capitals: Purushapura (now Peshawar in northwestern Pakistan) and Mathura, in northern India. He is also credited (along with Raja Dab) for building the massive, ancient Fort at Bathinda (Qila Mubarak), in the modern city of Bathinda, Indian Punjab.

The Kushans also had a summer capital in Bagram (then known as Kapisa), where the "Begram Treasure", comprising works of art from Greece to China, has been found. According to the Rabatak inscription, Kanishka was the son of Vima Kadphises, the grandson of Sadashkana, and the great-grandson of Kujula Kadphises. Kanishka's era is now generally accepted to have begun in 127 on the basis of Harry Falk's ground-breaking research. Kanishka's era was used as a calendar reference by the Kushans for about a century, until the decline of the Kushan realm.

Huvishka (c. 150 – c. 180)

Huvishka (Kushan: Οοηϸκι, "Ooishki") was a Kushan emperor from the death of Kanishka (assumed on the best evidence available to be in 150) until the succession of Vasudeva I about thirty years later. His rule was a period of retrenchment and consolidation for the Empire. In particular he devoted time and effort early in his reign to the exertion of greater control over the city of Mathura.

Vasudeva I (c. 190 – c. 230)

Vasudeva I (Kushan: Βαζοδηο "Bazodeo", Chinese: 波調 "Bodiao") was the last of the "Great Kushans". Named inscriptions dating from year 64 to 98 of Kanishka's era suggest his reign extended from at least AD 191 to 225. He was the last great Kushan emperor, and the end of his rule coincides with the invasion of the Sasanians as far as northwestern India, and the establishment of the Indo-Sasanians or Kushanshahs in what is nowadays Afghanistan, Pakistan and northwestern India from around AD 240.

Vāsishka (c. 247 – c. 267)

Vāsishka was a Kushan emperor who seems to have had a 20-year reign following Kanishka II. His rule is recorded at Mathura, in Gandhara and as far south as Sanchi (near Vidisa), where several inscriptions in his name have been found, dated to the year 22 (the Sanchi inscription of "Vaksushana" – i.e., Vasishka Kushana) and year 28 (the Sanchi inscription of Vasaska – i.e., Vasishka) of a possible second Kanishka era.

Little Kushans (AD 270 – 350) 
Following territory losses in the west (Bactria lost to the Kushano-Sasanians), and in the east (loss of Mathura to the Gupta Empire), several "Little Kushans" are known, who ruled locally in the area of Punjab with their capital at Taxila: Vasudeva II (270 – 300), Mahi (300 – 305), Shaka (305 – 335) and Kipunada (335 – 350). They probably were vassals of the Gupta Empire, until the invasion of the Kidarites destroyed the last remains of Kushan rule.

Kushan deities

The Kushan religious pantheon is extremely varied, as revealed by their coins that were made in gold, silver, and copper. These coins contained more than thirty different gods, belonging mainly to their own Iranian, as well as Greek and Indian worlds as well. Kushan coins had images of Kushan Kings, Buddha, and figures from the Indo-Aryan and Iranian pantheons. Greek deities, with Greek names are represented on early coins. During Kanishka's reign, the language of the coinage changes to Bactrian (though it remained in Greek script for all kings). After Huvishka, only two divinities appear on the coins: Ardoxsho and Oesho (see details below).

The Iranian entities depicted on coinage include:
 Ardoxsho (Αρδοχþο): Ashi Vanghuhi 
 Ashaeixsho (Aþαειχþo, "Best righteousness"): Asha Vahishta 
 Athsho (Αθþο, "The Royal fire"): Atar 
 Pharro (Φαρρο, "Royal splendour"): Khwarenah 
 Lrooaspa (Λροοασπο): Drvaspa 
 Manaobago (Μαναοβαγο): Vohu Manah 
 Mao (Μαο, the Lunar deity): Mah 
 Mithro and variants (Μιθρο, Μιιρο, Μιορο, Μιυρο): Mithra 
 Mozdooano (Μοζδοοανο, "Mazda the victorious?"): Mazda *vana 
 Nana (Νανα, Ναναια, Ναναϸαο): variations of pan-Asiatic Nana, Sogdian Nny, Anahita 
 Oado (Οαδο): Vata 
 Oaxsho (Oαxþo): "Oxus"
 Ooromozdo (Οορομοζδο): Ahura Mazda 
 Ořlagno (Οραλαγνο): Verethragna, the Iranian god of war 
 Rishti (Ριϸτι, "Uprightness"): Arshtat 
 Shaoreoro (Ϸαορηορο, "Best royal power", Archetypal ruler): Khshathra Vairya 
 Tiero (Τιερο): Tir

Representation of entities from Greek mythology and Hellenistic syncretism are:
 Zaoou (Ζαοου): Zeus  
 Ēlios (Ηλιος): Helios 
 Ēphaēstos (Ηφαηστος): Hephaistos
 Oa nēndo (Οα νηνδο): Nike 
 Salēnē (Ϲαληνη): Selene 
 Anēmos (Ανημος): Anemos 
 Ērakilo (Ηρακιλο): Heracles 
 Sarapo (Ϲαραπο): the Greco-Egyptian god Sarapis 

The Indic entities represented on coinage include:
 Boddo (Βοδδο): the Buddha 
 Shakamano Boddho (Ϸακαμανο Βοδδο): Shakyamuni Buddha 
 Metrago Boddo (Μετραγο Βοδδο): the bodhisattava Maitreya 
 Maaseno (Μαασηνο): Mahāsena  
 Skando-Komaro (Σκανδο-kομαρο): Skanda-Kumara 
 Bizago: Viśākha 
 Ommo: Umā, the consort of Siva. 
 Oesho (Οηϸο): long considered to represent Indic Shiva, but also identified as Avestan Vayu conflated with Shiva. 
 Two copper coins of Huvishka bear a "Ganesa" legend, but instead of depicting the typical theriomorphic figure of Ganesha, have a figure of an archer holding a full-length bow with string inwards and an arrow. This is typically a depiction of Rudra, but in the case of these two coins is generally assumed to represent Shiva.

Kushans and Buddhism

The Kushans inherited the Greco-Buddhist traditions of the Indo-Greek Kingdom they replaced, and their patronage of Buddhist institutions allowed them to grow as a commercial power. Between the mid-1st century and the mid-3rd century, Buddhism, patronized by the Kushans, extended to China and other Asian countries through the Silk Road.

Kanishka is renowned in Buddhist tradition for having convened a great Buddhist council in Kashmir. Along with his predecessors in the region, the Indo-Greek king Menander I (Milinda) and the Indian emperors Ashoka and Harsha Vardhana, Kanishka is considered by Buddhism as one of its greatest benefactors.

During the 1st century AD, Buddhist books were being produced and carried by monks, and their trader patrons. Also, monasteries were being established along these land routes that went from China and other parts of Asia. With the development of Buddhist books, it caused a new written language called Gandhara. Gandhara consists of eastern Afghanistan and northern Pakistan. Scholars are said to have found many Buddhist scrolls that contained the Gandhari language.

The reign of Huvishka corresponds to the first known epigraphic evidence of the Buddha Amitabha, on the bottom part of a 2nd-century statue which has been found in Govindo-Nagar, and now at the Mathura Museum. The statue is dated to "the 28th year of the reign of Huvishka", and dedicated to "Amitabha Buddha" by a family of merchants. There is also some evidence that Huvishka himself was a follower of Mahayana Buddhism. A Sanskrit manuscript fragment in the Schøyen Collection describes Huvishka as one who has "set forth in the Mahāyāna."

The 12th century historical chronicle Rajatarangini mentions in detail the rule of the Kushan kings and their benevolence towards Buddhism:

Kushan art

The art and culture of Gandhara, at the crossroads of the Kushan hegemony, developed the traditions of Greco-Buddhist art and are the best known expressions of Kushan influences to Westerners. Several direct depictions of Kushans are known from Gandhara, where they are represented with a tunic, belt and trousers and play the role of devotees to the Buddha, as well as the Bodhisattva and future Buddha Maitreya.

According to Benjamin Rowland, the first expression of Kushan art appears at Khalchayan at the end of the 2nd century BC. It is derived from Hellenistic art, and possibly from the art of the cities of Ai-Khanoum and Nysa, and clearly has similarities with the later Art of Gandhara, and may even have been at the origin of its development. Rowland particularly draws attention to the similarity of the ethnic types represented at Khalchayan and in the art of Gandhara, and also in the style of portraiture itself. For example, Rowland find a great proximity between the famous head of a Yuezhi prince from Khalchayan, and the head of Gandharan Bodhisattvas, giving the example of the Gandharan head of a Bodhisattva in the Philadelphia Museum of Art. The similarity of the Gandhara Bodhisattva with the portrait of the Kushan ruler Heraios is also striking. According to Rowland the Bactrian art of Khalchayan thus survived for several centuries through its influence in the art of Gandhara, thanks to the patronage of the Kushans.

During the Kushan Empire, many images of Gandhara share a strong resemblance to the features of Greek, Syrian, Persian and Indian figures. These Western-looking stylistic signatures often include heavy drapery and curly hair, representing a composite (the Greeks, for example, often possessed curly hair).

As the Kushans took control of the area of Mathura as well, the Art of Mathura developed considerably, and free-standing statues of the Buddha came to be mass-produced around this time, possibly encouraged by doctrinal changes in Buddhism allowing to depart from the aniconism that had prevailed in the Buddhist sculptures at Mathura, Bharhut or Sanchi from the end of the 2nd century BC. The artistic cultural influence of kushans declined slowly due to Hellenistic Greek and Indian influences.

Kushan monetary system

The Kushans used gold ingots as part of their monetary system, as shown by the gold treasure discovered in 1972 in Dalverzin Tepe. The main objects from the treasure were circular and parallelepipedic ingots, followed by various decorative objects and jewelry items. The circular ingots used to be progressively cut up as needed, depending on the amount required for a transaction. On the contrary, the parallelepipedic ingots were used to stock wealth in a not-divisible form; these ingots bear inscriptions in Kharoshthi mentioning their weight and the god Mitra (protector of contractuel relations) These ingots are all ttributed to the monetary system of the Kushan Empire.

The coinage of the Kushans was abundant and an important tool of propaganda in promoting each Kushan ruler. One of the names for Kushan coins was Dinara, which ultimately came from the Roman name Denarius aureus. The coinage of the Kushans was copied as far as the Kushano-Sasanians in the west, and the kingdom of Samatata in Bengal to the east. The coinage of the Gupta Empire was also initially derived from the coinage of the Kushan Empire, adopting its weight standard, techniques and designs, following the conquests of Samudragupta in the northwest. The imagery on Gupta coins then became more Indian in both style and subject matter compared to earlier dynasties, where Greco-Roman and Persian styles were mostly followed.

It has long been suggested that the gold contained in Kushan coins was ultimately of Roman origin, and that Roman coins were imported as a consequence of trade and melted in India to mint Kushan coins. However, a recent archaeometallurgical study of trace elements through proton activation analysis has shown that Kushan gold contains high concentrations of platinum and palladium, which rules out the hypothesis of a Roman provenance. To this day, the origin of Kushan gold remains unknown.

Contacts with Rome

Several Roman sources describe the visit of ambassadors from the Kings of Bactria and India during the 2nd century, probably referring to the Kushans.

Historia Augusta, speaking of Emperor Hadrian (117–138) tells:

Also in 138, according to Aurelius Victor (Epitome‚ XV, 4), and Appian (Praef., 7), Antoninus Pius, successor to Hadrian, received some Indian, Bactrian, and Hyrcanian ambassadors.

Some Kushan coins have an effigy of "Roma", suggesting a strong level of awareness and some level of diplomatic relations.

The summer capital of the Kushan Empire in Begram has yielded a considerable amount of goods imported from the Roman Empire—in particular, various types of glassware. The Chinese described the presence of Roman goods in the Kushan realm:

Parthamaspates of Parthia, a client of Rome and ruler of the kingdom of Osroene, is known to have traded with the Kushan Empire, goods being sent by sea and through the Indus River.

Contacts with China

During the 1st and 2nd century AD, the Kushan Empire expanded militarily to the north, putting them at the center of the profitable Central Asian commerce. They are related to have collaborated militarily with the Chinese against nomadic incursion, particularly when they allied with the Han dynasty general Ban Chao against the Sogdians in 84, when the latter were trying to support a revolt by the king of Kashgar. Around 85, they also assisted the Chinese general in an attack on Turpan, east of the Tarim Basin.

In recognition for their support to the Chinese, the Kushans requested a Han princess, but were denied, even after they had sent presents to the Chinese court. In retaliation, they marched on Ban Chao in 86 with a force of 70,000, but were defeated by a smaller Chinese force. The Yuezhi retreated and paid tribute to the Chinese Empire during the reign of emperor He of Han (89–106).

The Kushans are again recorded to have sent presents to the Chinese court in 158–159 during the reign of Emperor Huan of Han.

Following these interactions, cultural exchanges further increased, and Kushan Buddhist missionaries, such as Lokaksema, became active in the Chinese capital cities of Luoyang and sometimes Nanjing, where they particularly distinguished themselves by their translation work. They were the first recorded promoters of Hinayana and Mahayana scriptures in China, greatly contributing to the Silk Road transmission of Buddhism.

Decline

Kushano-Sassanians

After the death of Vasudeva I in 225, the Kushan empire split into western and eastern halves. The Western Kushans (in Afghanistan) were soon subjugated by the Persian Sasanian Empire and lost Sogdiana, Bactria, and Gandhara to them. The Sassanian king Shapur I (240–270) claims in his Naqsh-e Rostam inscription possession of the territory of the Kushans (Kūšān šahr) as far as "Purushapura" (Peshawar), suggesting he controlled Bactria and areas as far as the Hindu-Kush or even south of it:

This is also confirmed by the Rag-i-Bibi inscription in modern Afghanistan.

The Sasanians deposed the Western dynasty and replaced them with Persian vassals known as the Kushanshas (in Bactrian on their coinage: KΟÞANΟ ÞAΟ Koshano Shao) also called Indo-Sasanians or Kushano-Sasanians. The Kushano-Sasanians ultimately became very powerful under Hormizd I Kushanshah (277–286) and rebelled against the Sasanian Empire, while continuing many aspects of the Kushan culture, visible in particular in their titulature and their coinage.

"Little Kushans" and Gupta suzerainty

The Eastern Kushan kingdom, also known as the "Little Kushans", was based in the Punjab. Around 270 their territories on the Gangetic plain became independent under local dynasties such as the Yaudheyas. Then in the mid-4th century they were subjugated by the Gupta Empire under Samudragupta. In his inscription on the Allahabad pillar Samudragupta proclaims that the Dēvaputra-Shāhi-Shāhānushāhi (referring to the last Kushan rulers, being a deformation of the Kushan regnal titles Devaputra, Shao and Shaonanoshao: "Son of God, King, King of Kings") are now under his dominion, and that they were forced to "self-surrender, offering (their own) daughters in marriage and a request for the administration of their own districts and provinces". This suggests that by the time of the Allahabad inscription the Kushans still ruled in Punjab, but under the suzerainty of the Gupta Emperor.

Numimastics indicate that the coinage of the Eastern Kushans was much weakened: silver coinage was abandoned altogether, and gold coinage was debased. This suggests that the Eastern Kushans had lost their central trading role on the trade routes that supplied luxury goods and gold. Still, the Buddhist art of Gandhara continued to flourish, and cities such as Sirsukh near Taxila were established.

Sasanian, Kidarite and Alchon invasions

In the east around 350, Shapur II regained the upper hand against the Kushano-Sasanian Kingdom and took control of large territories in areas now known as Afghanistan and Pakistan, possibly as a consequence of the destruction of the Kushano-Sasanians by the Chionites. The Kushano-Sasanian still ruled in the north. Important finds of Sasanian coinage beyond the Indus river in the city of Taxila only start with the reigns of Shapur II (r.309-379) and Shapur III (r.383-388), suggesting that the expansion of Sasanian control beyond the Indus was the result of the wars of Shapur II "with the Chionites and Kushans" in 350-358 as described by Ammianus Marcellinus. They probably maintained control until the rise of the Kidarites under their ruler Kidara.

In 360 a Kidarite Hun named Kidara overthrew the Kushano-Sasanians and remnants of the old Kushan dynasty, and established the Kidarite Kingdom. The Kushan style of Kidarite coins indicates they claimed Kushan heritage. The Kidarite seem to have been rather prosperous, although on a smaller scale than their Kushan predecessors. East of the Punjab, the former eastern territories of the Kushans were controlled by the mighty Gupta Empire.

The remnants of Kushan culture under the Kidarites in the northwest were ultimately wiped out in the end of the 5th century by the invasions of the Alchon Huns (sometimes considered as a branch of the Hephthalites), and later the Nezak Huns.

Rulers
One of the most recent list of rulers with dates is as follows:
 Heraios (c. 1 – 30), first king to call himself "Kushan" on his coinage 
"Great Kushans";
 Kujula Kadphises (c. 50 – c. 90) 
 Vima Takto (c. 90 – c. 113), alias Soter Megas or "Great Saviour." 
 Vima Kadphises (c. 113 – c. 127) First great Kushan Emperor 
 Kanishka the Great (127 – c. 151) 
 Huvishka (c. 151 – c. 190) 
 Vasudeva I (c. 190 – 230) Last great Kushan Emperor 
 Kanishka II (c. 230 – 247) 
 Vashishka (c. 247 – 267) 
"Little Kushans";
 Kanishka III (c. 267 – 270) 
 Vasudeva II (c. 270 – 300) 
 Mahi (c. 300 – 305) 
 Shaka (c. 305 – 335) 
 Kipunada (c. 335 – 350)

See also
 History of Afghanistan
 Ancient history of Afghanistan
 Indo-Parthian Kingdom
 Mathura
 Taxila
 Kucha, another Tocharian-speaking kingdom (with a related etymology)
 Iranians in China

Notes

References

Sources

 

 
 
 
 

 
 

 
 Dorn'eich, Chris M. (2008). Chinese sources on the History of the Niusi-Wusi-Asi (oi)-Rishi (ka)-Arsi-Arshi-Ruzhi and their Kueishuang-Kushan Dynasty. Shiji 110/Hanshu 94A: The Xiongnu: Synopsis of Chinese original Text and several Western Translations with Extant Annotations. Berlin. To read or download go to: 

 

 Faccenna, Domenico (1980). Butkara I (Swāt, Pakistan) 1956–1962, Volume III 1 (in English). Rome: IsMEO (Istituto Italiano Per Il Medio Ed Estremo Oriente).
 
 
 
 Foucher, M. A. 1901. "Notes sur la geographie ancienne du Gandhâra (commentaire à un chaptaire de Hiuen-Tsang)." BEFEO No. 4, Oct. 1901, pp. 322–369.

 
 
 

 Hargreaves, H. (1910–11). "Excavations at Shāh-jī-kī Dhērī"; Archaeological Survey of India. pp. 25–32.
 
 
 
 Hill, John E. 2004. The Peoples of the West from the Weilüe 魏略 by Yu Huan 魚豢: A Third Century Chinese Account Composed between 239 and 265 CE. Draft annotated English translation. 
 
 Hoey, W. "The Word Kozola as Used of Kadphises on Ku͟s͟hān Coins." Journal of the Royal Asiatic Society of Great Britain and Ireland, 1902, pp. 428–429. .

 Iloliev, A. "King of Men: ῾Ali ibn Abi Talib in Pamiri Folktales." Journal of Shi'a Islamic Studies, vol. 8 no. 3, 2015, pp. 307–323. Project MUSE, doi:10.1353/isl.2015.0036.

 Kennedy, J. "The Later Kushans." Journal of the Royal Asiatic Society of Great Britain and Ireland, 1913, pp. 1054–1064. .
 Konow, Sten, ed. 1929. Kharoshthī Inscriptions with Exception of those of Asoka. Corpus Inscriptionum Indicarum, Vol. II, Part I. Reprint: Indological Book House, Varanasi, 1969.

 
 
 
 
 
 

 
 
 Masson, V. M. "The Forgotten Kushan Empire: New Discoveries at Zar-Tepe." Archaeology, vol. 37, no. 1, 1984, pp. 32–37. .

 

 
 
 

 "Red Sandstone Railing Pillar." The British Museum Quarterly, vol. 30, no. 1/2, 1965, pp. 64–64. .
  
 
 Rife, J. L. "The Making of Roman India by Grant Parker (review)." American Journal of Philology, vol. 135 no. 4, 2014, pp. 672–675. Project MUSE, doi:10.1353/ajp.2014.0046.
 
 
 

 
 Sarianidi, Viktor. 1985. The Golden Hoard of Bactria: From the Tillya-tepe Excavations in Northern Afghanistan. Harry N. Abrams, Inc. New York.
 
 Sims-Williams, Nicholas. 1998. "Further notes on the Bactrian inscription of Rabatak, with an Appendix on the names of Kujula Kadphises and Vima Taktu in Chinese." Proceedings of the Third European Conference of Iranian Studies Part 1: Old and Middle Iranian Studies. Edited by Nicholas Sims-Williams. Wiesbaden. pp. 79–93.
 
 Spooner, D. B. (1908–09). "Excavations at Shāh-jī-kī Dhērī."; Archaeological Survey of India. pp. 38–59.

 Watson, Burton. Trans. 1993. Records of the Grand Historian of China: Han Dynasty II. Translated from the Shiji of Sima Qian. Chapter 123: "The Account of Dayuan", Columbia University Press. Revised Edition. ;  (pbk.)

External links

 Kushan dynasty in Encyclopædia Britannica
 Metropolitan Museum capsule history
 
 Coins of the Kushans on wildwinds.com
 
 Brief Guide to Kushan History 
 The CoinIndia Online Catalogue of Kushan Coins
 Dedicated resource to study of Kushan Empire 
 imalayan and Central Asian Studies: Journal of Himalayan Research and Cultural Foundation Volume 5 Issue 2

 
Ancient history of Afghanistan
Ancient history of Pakistan
Ancient empires and kingdoms of India
Buddhism in Afghanistan
History of Buddhism in India
History of Buddhism in Pakistan
Dynasties of India
Empires and kingdoms of India
Former empires in Asia
Historical Iranian peoples
Iranian nomads
History of Tajikistan
Lists of monarchs
Nomadic groups in Eurasia
Yuezhi
1st-century establishments in India
375 disestablishments
4th-century disestablishments in India